The Dancing Ferret entertainment group is an unofficial collective name for Dancing Ferret Discs and Dancing Ferret Concerts. It was started by Patrick Rodgers (a.k.a. DJ Ferret) in 1995 with the formation of Dancing Ferret Concerts. The company markets bands from the gothic rock, heavy metal, alternative rock, neo-Medieval, trip hop, and industrial genres of music.

In July 2008, Dancing Ferret Discs made the decision to cease releasing new material on their label starting in November of that year. However, they stated that they would continue to distribute all of their previous releases. The label's last official new release was "Sverker" by Corvus Corax.

Dancing Ferret Discs
Dancing Ferret Discs is a Philadelphia-based record label started in August 1998. It is the record label "sister company" of Dancing Ferret, and hosts bands in the alternative scene. While the label is no longer signing new bands or releasing new material, a partial list of bands that were previously signed to DFD includes:

Absurd Minds
Angelspit
Behind The Scenes
Carfax Abbey
Corvus Corax
The Crüxshadows
De/Vision
The Dreamside
Ego Likeness
Eisbrecher
Estampie
Faun
Gothminister
Information Society
Irfan
Joachim Witt
The Last Dance
Lunascape
Mo-Do
Neuroticfish  
Paralysed Age
Qntal
Subway to Sally
ThouShaltNot
Voltaire

Some of these bands were signed to Dancing Ferret's sublabel, Noir Records, which focuses on less club-oriented fare.

In 2005, Dancing Ferret Discs released Dancing in the Dark: 10 Years of Dancing Ferret, a compilation album with songs from some of the label's artists.

Dancing Ferret Concerts
Dancing Ferret Concerts produces concerts, club events and DJ dance nights in the City of Philadelphia. Its weekly party, "Nocturne," debuted in January 1996. Nocturne ceased its weekly event on August 1, 2012, at a different venue than it had been home to.

References

External links
Dancing Ferret Discs information site

Heavy metal record labels
American independent record labels
Record labels established in 1995
Goth record labels
Industrial record labels
Alternative rock record labels